Stan Crowther is the name of:

Stanley Crowther (1925–2013), British Labour MP
Stan Crowther (footballer) (1935–2014), English footballer